The New Jewish Cemetery is a historic necropolis situated on 55 Miodowa Street in Kraków, Poland. Since 1999, the cemetery is a registered heritage monument. The grounds also feature a well-preserved mortuary.

History
The New Jewish Cemetery was founded in 1800 on grounds purchased by the Jewish Qahal from the Augustinians. It was enlarged in 1836 with additional land purchased from the monks. Following Poland's return to independence, the New Cemetery became nearly full. From 1932 on, burials were directed to a new plot bought in 1926 by the Qahal along Abrahama Street and the one at nearby Jerozolimska Street, both in the Wola Duchacka neighborhood (now part of Podgórze district). These two other cemeteries formed the site of the Kraków-Płaszów concentration camp during the Holocaust and no longer exist. The Jews from the Kraków Ghetto were sent there.

World War II
Following the Nazi invasion of Poland in World War II, the New Cemetery was closed to outsiders and the Germans sold the most valuable stonework to local masons. Other headstones, as well as slabs, were turned into construction material and used for paving the supply road to the camp, including the courtyard of commandant Amon Göth, who is known for having insisted that the Jews pay for their own executions. Meanwhile, the old bones at the cemetery were often left uncovered and scattered around in what looked like an open-pit mine. Caretaker Pina Ladner, who used to live on premises, was sent to Płaszów beforehand, and shot.

Soon after the war ended, a local civil engineer identified only as Mr. Stendig, likely Jakub Stendig, a camp survivor, recovered many tombstones from the Płaszów camp site, and arranged to have them reinstalled at the New Cemetery.

Restoration
In 1957, the grounds were renovated with funds from the Joint Distribution Committee. On March 24, 1999, the cemetery, including the 1903 mortuary, were entered into the register of historical monuments of Kraków.

The New Jewish Cemetery features a renovated brick mortuary hall built in 1903, as well as the postwar lapidary memorial fitted with old headstones and crowned with a block of black marble. The cemetery contains over 10,000 tombs, the oldest dating from 1809. There are many monuments commemorating the death of Jews killed during the Holocaust.

Notable individuals buried at the cemetery
Those buried at the New Jewish Cemetery of Kraków include:

Picture gallery

See also
 Remuh Cemetery known also as the Old Jewish Cemetery of Kraków
 Rakowicki Cemetery, the main necropolis of the city of Kraków

Footnotes

References

External links
 
 
 

Jewish cemeteries in Poland
Cemeteries in Kraków
Jews and Judaism in Kraków
Holocaust locations in Poland
Cemetery vandalism and desecration